Eparama Navale is a Fijian rugby league footballer who represented Fiji at the 2000 World Cup.

Playing career
Navale played for the Parramatta Eels in 1997 and 1998. In 2000, Navale played in one match for the Northern Eagles.

References

1975 births
Living people
Fiji national rugby league team players
Fijian rugby league players
I-Taukei Fijian people
Northern Eagles players
Parramatta Eels players
People from Nadroga-Navosa Province
Rugby league centres
Rugby league wingers